Symphytum is a genus of flowering plants in the borage family, Boraginaceae, known by the common name comfrey (pronounced ). There are 59 recognized species.  Some species and hybrids, particularly S. officinale, Symphytum grandiflorum, and S. × uplandicum, are used in gardening and herbal medicine. They are not to be confused with Andersonglossum virginianum, known as wild comfrey, another member of the borage family.

Species
Species include:
Symphytum asperum – prickly comfrey, rough comfrey
Symphytum bulbosum – bulbous comfrey
Symphytum brachycalyx - Palestine comfrey
Symphytum caucasicum – Caucasian comfrey
Symphytum grandiflorum – creeping comfrey
Symphytum ibericum – Iberian comfrey
Symphytum officinale – comfrey
Symphytum orientale – white comfrey
Symphytum tauricum – Crimean comfrey
Symphytum tuberosum – tuberous comfrey
Symphytum × uplandicum (S. asperum × S. officinale, synonym: S. peregrinum) – Russian comfrey, healing herb, blackwort, bruisewort, wallwort, gum plant

Cultivation
The Russian comfrey 'Bocking 14' cultivar was developed during the 1950s by Lawrence D. Hills, the founder of the Henry Doubleday Research Association (the organic gardening organization itself named after Henry Doubleday, who first introduced Russian comfrey into Britain in the nineteenth century) following trials at Bocking, Essex.

Propagation

Bocking 14 is sterile, and therefore will not set seed (one of its advantages over other cultivars as it will not spread out of control); thus, it is propagated from root cuttings. This removes the crown, which can then be split into pieces. The original plant will quickly recover, and each piece can be replanted with the growing points just below the soil surface, and will quickly grow into new plants. Offsets can also be purchased by mail order from specialist nurseries in order to initially build up a stock of plants.

Phytochemistry, folk medicine, and toxicity
Folk medicine names for comfrey include knitbone, boneset, and the derivation of its Latin name Symphytum (from the Greek symphis, meaning growing together of bones, and phyton, a plant), referring to its ancient uses. Similarly, the common French name is consoude, meaning to weld together. The tradition in different cultures and languages suggest a common belief in its usefulness for mending bones.

Comfrey contains mixed phytochemicals in varying amounts, including allantoin, mucilage, saponins, tannins, pyrrolizidine alkaloids, and inulin, among others. Pyrrolizidine alkaloids are responsible for comfreys production of hepatotoxicity.Liver toxicity is associated with consuming this plant or its extracts. In modern herbalism, comfrey is most commonly used topically.

In 2001, the United States Food and Drug Administration issued a ban of comfrey products marketed for internal use, and a warning label for those intended for external use. Comfrey is particularly contraindicated during pregnancy and lactation, in infants, and in people with liver, kidney, or vascular diseases.

References

External links

Healthline 

 
 
Boraginaceae genera
Taxa named by Carl Linnaeus